Gavin Hamilton may refer to:

 Gavin Hamilton (archbishop of St Andrews) (died 1571), archbishop of St Andrews
 Gavin Hamilton (bishop of Galloway) (1561–1612), bishop of Galloway
 Gavin Hamilton (artist) (1723–1798), Scottish artist
 Gavin Hamilton (lawyer) (1751–1805), Friend of Robert Burns
 Gavin Hamilton, 2nd Baron Hamilton of Dalzell (1872–1952), British politician
 Gavin Hamilton (British Army officer) (1953–1982), SAS officer killed in Falklands War
 Gavin Hamilton (cricketer) (born 1974), Scottish cricketer

See also
 Gawen Hamilton (1698–1737), artist